The Tamoios Environmental Protection Area is an environmental protection area of the state of Rio de Janeiro, Brazil. It protects an area of coastal forests, mangroves, rocky shores and islands.

Location

The Tamoios Environmental Protection Area (APA) is in the municipality of Angra dos Reis, Rio de Janeiro, in the region  known as the Costa Verde.
The APA has a mainland portion covering the Marinah area, and an insular portion covering the Ilha Grande and all other islands in the municipality of Angra dos Reis in the basins of  Ilha Grande, Ribeira and Jacuacanga.
The APA extends across Angra dos Reis from the mouth of the Mambucaba River, adjacent to the historic village of Mambucaba, in the west on the boundary with the municipality of Paraty to the boundary with the municipality of Mangaratiba in the east.
The boundaries contain , but only the land and islands are covered by the decree creating the APA.

The reserve protects extensive areas of mangroves, which are important as breeding areas for fish and shellfish.
There are also rocky coasts and restinga areas of great scenic beauty that are home to a rich variety of flora and fauna.
Lack of regulation and control has allowed the marine ecosystem to degrade and lose biodiversity and landscape quality.

19 of the islands are part of the Tamoios Ecological Station.
The APA contains the  Praia do Sul Biological Reserve and the  Ilha Grande State Park.
The APA also includes  of land that is not fully protected.
The Ilha Grande has been part of the Atlantic Forest Biosphere Reserve since 1992.
It is part of the Bocaina Mosaic of conservation units.

History

The Tamoios Environmental Protection Area was created by decree 9.452 of the governor of Rio de Janeiro on 5 December 1982.
The decree was signed in 1986.
The purpose is to protect the natural environment of great scenic beauty, home to rare and endangered species, as well as caiçaras communities integrated into these ecosystems.
The master plan was instituted on 1 July 1994.

Decree 41.921 of June 2009 authorized installation of new projects in the wildlife conservation area of the APA, where previously only  renovation or expansion of existing buildings was allowed.
Since 2011 there has been discussion about creation by the state of an Ilha Grande Marine Environmental Protection Area to control and manage the marine environment.
The management plan was approved on 25 April 2013.

Notes

Sources

1982 establishments in Brazil
Environmental protection areas of Brazil
Protected areas of Rio de Janeiro (state)
Angra dos Reis